Agardhiella zoltanorum is a species of gastropod belonging to the family Agardhiellidae.

The species is found in Greece.

References

Pupilloidea
Gastropods described in 2008